Gabon competed in the 2003 All-Africa Games held at the National Stadium in the city of Abuja, Nigeria. The team won a single silver medal, won by Melanie Engaong in the judo tournament.

Competitors
Gabon entered sixteen events. In boxing, Romeo Braxir entered the light fly. Gable Garenamotse competed in the long jump, coming fifth. Genevieve Obone, Marie-Jeanne Binga, Stellan Ndibi and Wilfred Bigangoye entered the 100 metres races but did not start.

Medal summary
Gabon won a single silver medal, and was ranked joint twenty ninth in the final medal table alongside Gambia.

Medal table

List of Medalists

Silver Medal

References

2003 in Gabonese sport
Nations at the 2003 All-Africa Games
2003